Doctor in Trouble is a 1970 British comedy film, the seventh and last film in the Doctor series. It was directed by Ralph Thomas and stars Leslie Phillips as a doctor who gets accidentally trapped on an outgoing cruise ship while it begins a round the world trip. The cast was rounded out by a number of British comedy actors including James Robertson Justice, Harry Secombe and Angela Scoular. It was based on the 1961 novel Doctor on Toast by Richard Gordon.

Plot
Renowned surgeon Sir Lancelot Spratt (James Robertson Justice) arranges a cruise for his patient, the famous television star Basil Beauchamp (Simon Dee). The captain of the ship is Lancelot Spratt's brother George Spratt (Robert Morley).

Doctor Burke (Leslie Phillips) becomes a stowaway by mistake when chasing his girlfriend Ophelia (Angela Scoular) onto the ship to propose to her. She is one of a group of models doing a fashion shoot with camp photographer Roddy (Graham Chapman). Other passengers aboard ship include pools winner Llewellyn Wendover (Harry Secombe) and Mrs. Dailey (Irene Handl), a socially ambitious lady hoping to find a wealthy match for her daughter Dawn (Janet Mahoney).

Burke is pursued by the Master-at-Arms (Freddie Jones) who correctly suspects that he does not have a ticket. Burke tries various ruses to try to escape him, including dressing up as a doctor. Eventually he is caught and exposed as a stowaway. Captain Spratt orders him to serve as an orderly, scrubbing the ship.

When the ship's doctor falls ill from a tropical disease, Burke takes over his duties. He is called into action when a Soviet cargo ship sends a request for help due to a patient with acute appendicitis. Burke is transferred to that ship to perform an operation. By the time he has finished his own ship has departed, and he is forced to stay on board the Soviet vessel until it reaches Grimsby. When the cruise ship finally returns to port, Burke learns his girlfriend has married the ship's doctor, now recovered from his illness.

Meanwhile, Dawn Dailey, having failed to snare Captain Spratt, decides to marry Wendover. She learns after the wedding that he is not as wealthy as she had imagined.

Main cast

 Leslie Phillips as Dr. Tony Burke
 Harry Secombe as Llewellyn Wendover
 Robert Morley as Captain George Spratt
 James Robertson Justice as Sir Lancelot Spratt
 Simon Dee as Basil Beauchamp
 Angela Scoular as Ophelia O'Brien
 Irene Handl as Mrs. Dailey
 Janet Mahoney as Dawn Dailey
 Freddie Jones as Master-at-Arms
 Joan Sims as Russian Captain
 John Le Mesurier as Purser
 Graham Stark as Saterjee
 Graham Chapman as Roddy
 Jacki Piper as Girl in taxi
 Fred Emney as Father
 Yuri Borienko as Sick Russian
 Gerald Sim as 1st Doctor
 Yutte Stensgaard as Eve (Model)
 Jimmy Thompson as Ship's Doctor
 Sylvana Henriques as Model
 Marcia Fox as Jean
 Tom Kempinski as Stedman Green
 Anthony Sharp as Chief Surgeon
 Marianne Stone as Spinster
 John Bluthal as TV Doctor

Production
The film was based on the book Doctor on Toast, published in 1961. The plot of the book focused on Dr Grymsdyke and was different from the final film.

The original intention was for James Robertson Justice to play two roles, Sir Lancelot Spratt and his twin-brother Captain George Spratt (a variation of the part of Captain Hogg that he had played in Doctor at Sea) – "the best part of any we'd done together" according to producer Betty Box.

However, shortly before filming, Justice had a cerebral stroke and was rushed from his home near Inverness to Aberdeen for brain surgery. Justice recovered and wanted to play both roles as planned but the filmmakers decided he would be unable to do so, in part because he now had an uncontrollable tremor in his right arm. The part of Captain Spratt was offered to Robert Morley (who had been considered for the role of Lancelot Spratt in Doctor in the House but had wanted too much money). James Robertson Justice still played the smaller role of Lancelot. "It must have taken every ounce of energy he possessed to do it", said Box. "We knew he needed the money and paid him for both parts – he certainly deserved it for long and loyal service."

Producer Betty Box said the film "wasn't a happy time for" her and director Ralph Thomas as they knew it "was the last movie we'd be able to make" with Justice. She felt Robert Morley's casting undermined the picture. "Situations which would have been hilarious with James were just mildly amusing with Morley, and the whole point of the piece was lost", she said. Despite good performances from other members of the cast, she thought "the entire project was doomed... from the day a real life surgeon said the world 'Scalpel' over dear James's unconscious bulk."

It was Leslie Phillip's third appearance in a "Doctor" film. He played Dr Tony Burke, the same character he played in Doctor in Love. In Doctor in Clover, he played Dr Gaston Grimsdyke.

It was the first time Angela Scoular acted opposite Leslie Phillips; the two would later fall in love and marry.

The film was in production concurrently with the first series of the Doctor in the House television series, in which Yutte Stensgaard (Eve) had a recurring role and Graham Chapman (Roddie) was one of the writers.

Reception
Ralph Thomas did not like the film saying "the unit was getting desperate, of course, and the title says it all; but it still, fortunately, continued making money, but I couldn't bear to make any more films in the series. And so Rank said "Well, right. Would you allow us to dispose of your interest in a television series. And I said "yes I've love to" and so they did."

Box thought the Doctor series "died" when James Robertson Justice did.

Penelope Mortimer of The Observer wrote "why all this talent, of various kinds, gets absolutely nowhere must be the fault of the screenplay... For it is a dreadful story, a terrible script, inadequately seasoned with worn out laughs. In all fairness I must say that a large section of the audience was hooting with laughter. It is on occasionals like this that one feels one has dropped from Mars."

The film receives two stars out of five in the Radio Times Guide to Films, which describes it as "innocently smutty" and feeling like it has been made up of "leftovers from Doctor at Sea".

References

Box, Bett, Lifting the Lid, 2000

External links
 

1970 films
1970 comedy films
British comedy films
Doctor in the House
1970s English-language films
Films directed by Ralph Thomas
Medical-themed films
Films shot at Pinewood Studios
Films produced by Betty Box
1970s British films